Rafael Martín Vázquez (born 25 September 1965) is a Spanish former professional footballer who played mostly as an attacking midfielder.

He represented most notably Real Madrid, having two different spells and amassing La Liga totals of 252 games and 42 goals for the club. He also played abroad in Italy, France, Mexico and Germany.

Martín Vázquez appeared for Spain at the 1990 World Cup and Euro 1988, winning nearly 40 caps.

Club career
Born in Madrid, Martín Vázquez joined the youth academy of Real Madrid in 1980 at the age of 15 and made his debut for the first team three years later, going on to achieve fame as part of the La Quinta del Buitre which still included Míchel, Emilio Butragueño, Miguel Pardeza and Manolo Sanchís. In 1989–90, as Real achieved a club and La Liga record of 107 goals, he scored a career-best 14, second only in the squad to Hugo Sánchez's 38 successful strikes.

After the arrival of Romanian Gheorghe Hagi, Martín Vázquez decided to accept the offer of Torino FC, but failed to settle in Italy during his two-season spell, although he did help the side reach the 1992 UEFA Cup Final. He then moved to Olympique de Marseille but only lasted two months in France, after which a return to Real Madrid was arranged; in his two stints with the latter he won six leagues, two UEFA Cups and two Copa del Rey.

As injuries hit him, Martín Vázquez eventually retired from football at the end of 1998, after unassuming spells with Deportivo de La Coruña, Atlético Celaya – where he teamed up with Butragueño – and Karlsruher SC (German 2. Bundesliga). Afterwards, he worked with Real Madrid as a youth coach while also keeping fit with the club's veterans.

International career
Martín Vázquez played 38 times for Spain, including at UEFA Euro 1988 and the 1990 FIFA World Cup. His debut came on 23 September 1987, in a friendly against Luxembourg.

International goals

Honours
Real Madrid
La Liga: 1985–86, 1986–87, 1987–88, 1988–89, 1989–90, 1994–95
Copa del Rey: 1988–89, 1992–93
Copa de la Liga: 1985
Supercopa de España: 1988, 1989, 1993
UEFA Cup: 1984–85, 1985–86
Copa Iberoamericana: 1994

Torino
UEFA Cup runner-up: 1991–92

Spain U21
UEFA European Under-21 Championship: 1986

Individual
Spanish Player of the Year: 1990

References

External links

1965 births
Living people
Spanish footballers
Footballers from Madrid
Association football midfielders
La Liga players
Segunda División players
Real Madrid Castilla footballers
Real Madrid CF players
Deportivo de La Coruña players
Serie A players
Torino F.C. players
Ligue 1 players
Olympique de Marseille players
Liga MX players
Atlético Celaya footballers
2. Bundesliga players
Karlsruher SC players
UEFA Cup winning players
Spain youth international footballers
Spain under-21 international footballers
Spain under-23 international footballers
Spain amateur international footballers
Spain international footballers
UEFA Euro 1988 players
1990 FIFA World Cup players
Spanish expatriate footballers
Expatriate footballers in France
Expatriate footballers in Italy
Expatriate footballers in Mexico
Expatriate footballers in Germany
Spanish expatriate sportspeople in France
Spanish expatriate sportspeople in Italy
Spanish expatriate sportspeople in Mexico
Spanish expatriate sportspeople in Germany
Spanish football managers
Segunda División B managers
Extremadura UD managers